Samoa competed at the 2000 Summer Paralympics in Sydney. The country made its Paralympic début by sending a single athlete, Mose Faatamala, to compete in track and field. Faatamala did not win a medal.

Athletics

See also
2000 Summer Paralympics
Samoa at the Paralympics
Samoa at the 2000 Summer Olympics

External links
International Paralympic Committee

References

Nations at the 2000 Summer Paralympics
2000
Paralympics